Inverloch may refer to:

 Inverloch, Victoria, a seaside town in Victoria, Australia
 Inverloch (webcomic), a webcomic
 Inverloch Castle, the pub Inverloch Arms, and Inverloch, Scotland, fictional places in Les Spectres d'Inverloch